Chahak may refer to:
 Chahak, Bushehr
 Chahak, Chaharmahal and Bakhtiari
 Chahak, Anbarabad, Kerman Province
 Chahak, Jiroft, Kerman Province
 Chahak, Manujan, Kerman Province
 Chahak, Qaleh Ganj, Kerman Province
 Chahak, Kohgiluyeh and Boyer-Ahmad
 Chahak, Qom
 Chahak, Khoshab, Razavi Khorasan Province
 Chahak, Dalgan, Sistan and Baluchestan Province
 Chahak, Eskelabad, Khash County, Sistan and Baluchestan Province
 Chahak, South Khorasan
 Chahak, Yazd
 Chahak Rural District, in Yazd Province